Jan Erik Kongshaug (4 July 1944 – 5 November 2019) was a Norwegian sound engineer, jazz guitarist, and composer.

Career

Kongshaug was born in Trondheim, the son of guitarist John Kongshaug. During his childhood and adolescence, he began to play the accordion (1950), guitar (1958) and bass (1964). Kongshaug gained his examen artium in 1963, and trained in electronics at the Trondheim Technical School in 1967. Then he worked for the Arne Bendiksen Studio (1967–1974) and Talent Studio (1974–79) in Oslo, and undertook some jobs in New York. In 1984, he founded his own recording studio, Rainbow Studio in Oslo and evolved into being one of the grand masters of Sound engineering. Altogether, he produced over 4,000 records, and was particularly known for some 700 recordings for ECM Records made from 1970 onwards.

Kongshaug played with Åse Kleveland winning the Norsk Melodi Grand Prix in 1966, and was third in the Eurovision Song Contest (1966). He has also played on dozens of recordings, including with Asmund Bjørken, Frode Thingnæs, Sven Nyhus, Arild Andersen and Frode Alnæs.

Honors
Spellemannprisen 1982, Special Award Diploma
Gammleng-prisen 2012, Studio Award

Discography
The Other World (ACT, 1999)
All These Years (Ponca Jazz, 2003)

References

External links
 
Rainbow Studio Website

1944 births
2019 deaths
Norwegian jazz guitarists
Norwegian jazz composers
Male jazz composers
Musicians from Trondheim
ACT Music artists